Comănești is a commune located in Suceava County, Romania. It is composed of two villages, more specifically Comănești and Humoreni. These were part of Botoșana Commune until 2002, when they were split off.

Administration and local politics

Communal council 

The commune's current local council has the following political composition, according to the results of the 2020 Romanian local elections:

References 

Communes in Suceava County
Localities in Southern Bukovina